The Venue may refer to any of various places including:

 The Venue (Liverpool), former nightclub and cinema in Liverpool
 The Venue (Leicester Square, London), now the Leicester Square Theatre
 The Venue, also known as Big V or Venners, a nightclub in New Cross, London
 The Venue (Lafayette, Indiana), former music venue in Lafayette, Indiana
 The Zodiac (club), Oxford, England, previously known as The Venue
 The Venue (Leeds), concert space at Leeds College of Music, West Yorkshire, England
 The Venue (Victoria Street, London), music venue and nightclub owned by Virgin. Opened 1978, closed 1984.